Dallas Voice is a weekly LGBT-focused newspaper based in Dallas, Texas. The paper was founded in 1984. It is published by the Voice Publishing Company, Inc.

New issues are published on Fridays, with a circulation of 13,000 papers per week in Dallas, Tarrant, Collin, Parker and Denton counties. The paper claims a print readership of more than 30,000 weekly readers, and more than 128,000 unique monthly visits to its website.

Headquarters
The Dallas Voice offices are located in the 'Dallas Design District', an LGBT friendly area.

See also
 LGBT rights in Texas
 LGBT culture in Dallas-Fort Worth
 List of LGBT periodicals

References

External links 
Dallas Voice — official website

Newspapers published in the Dallas–Fort Worth metroplex
LGBT culture in Texas
Dallas Voice, The
1984 establishments in Texas
1980s LGBT literature
Weekly newspapers published in Texas